Liquid News was a daily round up of entertainment news for BBC Three (and before that BBC Choice) running from 30 May 2000 to 1 April 2004. The show was also broadcast weekly on BBC One and internationally on BBC Prime and BBC America.

The programme originally evolved from Zero 30, the previous entertainment programme on BBC News 24. Once this was dropped from the 24-hour news channel, controller of the then BBC Choice, Stuart Murphy, took the format and brought it to the channel where it soon became the flagship programme.

Format
Each show started with a rundown of the headlines that featured in that edition of Liquid News after the main titles and the host introducing themselves. The show featured celebrity news from around the world (though mainly the UK, live reports from staff in New York, Los Angeles and Cannes during the Cannes Film Festival.

Every edition had guests in the studio with the host to provide their opinions on the news featured, offer their views and to reflect with the host on those stories and to plug their own shows or records that they were promoting at the time.

The show would divide itself into sections of discussion which usually fell into the categories of Music, Film, Television and sometimes Sport which featured a main story of a pre-recorded or insert live from the regular roster of Liquid News reporters.

A number of special editions of Liquid News were made to celebrate major events in the celebrity world, which left the usual confines of the studio. One such edition took place at a rooftop pool in which Christopher Price was behind a small tiki bar with the guests sitting on bar stools.

Cancellation
In April 2004 the show was cancelled. Murphy, who also went on to be controller of BBC Three, stated that the show would end as a way to "refresh the channel's output to best serve the audience". The news element of the channel was unaffected by the ending of the programme with 60 Seconds and The 7 O'Clock News already in existence serving as the replacement. The 7 O'Clock News was later axed in 2005, while 60 Seconds departed screens alongside BBC Three in February 2016.

Presenters
Liquid News was originally a vehicle for presenter Christopher Price. Following his death on 21 April 2002, the show continued with a variety of presenters including Colin Paterson, Claudia Winkleman, Julia Morris, Iain Lee, Jasmine Lowson, Paddy O'Connell, Jo Whiley, Joe Mace and Amanda Byram.

Reporters
The lineup of reporting staff included Colin Paterson, Stephanie West, Vanessa Langford, Tamzin Sylvester and Ruth Liptrot.

Theme music
Both versions of the theme tune have been composed by Moby, the first of which being an original composition that had not been included on the Play album titled "Bedhead". The second was a DJ Tiesto remix of "We Are All Made of Stars", which featured on the single release.

References

External links

2000 British television series debuts
2004 British television series endings
BBC Television shows
BBC television news shows